This is a list of the endemic reptile species recorded in Papua New Guinea.

Turtles

Lizards

Snakes

See also
Fauna of New Guinea
List of endemic amphibians of Papua New Guinea
List of endemic fish of Papua New Guinea
List of birds of Papua New Guinea
List of butterflies of Papua New Guinea
List of mammals of Papua New Guinea

References

 
Papua New Guinea
Reptiles
Endemic fauna of Papua New Guinea
Papua New Guinea